Damaso Luis Martínez Eguílaz y Eguílaz (20 August 1830 – 22 July 1874) was a Spanish writer and dramatist, father of playwright Rosa de Eguílaz y Renart.

Biography
Luis de Eguílaz was a disciple of the humanist and unfrocked friar Juan María Capitán. He found his dramatic vocation early; at age 14 he premiered the one-act comedy Por dinero baila el perro in Jerez de la Frontera. He studied law in Madrid and began his literary career with a critical study of the novel Clemencia by Fernán Caballero. He sometimes used the pseudonym El Licenciado Escribe (the graduate writer), a play on the name of the famous French dramatist Eugène Scribe.

Thanks to him, Eguílaz was able to release his first serious work, Verdades amargas, in 1853, the success of which placed him among the most popular authors of the time. In the last years of his life he directed the National Historical Archive. The news greatly affected Marcelino Menéndez y Pelayo, who was spending that summer in Santander, and composed a poem in Eguílaz's memory dated 5 August 1874. There is an oil portrait of Luis de Eguílaz in the Ateneo de Sanlúcar de Barrameda.

Works
Luis de Eguílaz's dramatic works are vigorously conceived, with well-defined characters, but have an excessive and perhaps inflexible lyricism. His theater is that of traditionalist ideology, and indoctrinates through the procedures of costumbrismo. His works can be divided into three groups:
 Works of moralizing and practical tenor, such as Mentiras dulces (1859), Verdades amargas (1853), Los soldados de plomo (1865), La cruz del matrimonio (1860; his greatest success), Grazalema, Quiero y no puedo, La vida de Juan Soldado, etc.
 Zarzuela librettos: El salto del pasiego (1878; posthumous, with music by Manuel Fernández Caballero), El molinero de Subiza (1870; music by Cristóbal Oudrid, undoubtedly his greatest success in this genre), El esclavo (1857), etc.

Notes

References

Further reading
 
 

1830 births
1874 deaths
19th-century Spanish dramatists and playwrights
People from Sanlúcar de Barrameda
19th-century Spanish lawyers